DIPA may refer to:

 Dipa (given name)
 Dirección de Investigación de Políticas Antidemocráticas, Argentine political police of Juan Carlos Onganía's dictatorship, active in the 1969 Cordobazo uprising
 Democratic Alignment (DiPa), a political party in Cyprus
 Diisopropylamine, a chemical compound
 2,6-Diisopropylaniline, a chemical compound
 Double India pale ale, a beer style